Sir Marcus Somerville, 4th Baronet (1772 – 11 July 1831) was an Anglo-Irish politician. 

Somerville was the son of Sir James Quaile Somerville, 3rd Baronet and Catherine Crofton. He was the Member of Parliament for Meath in the Irish House of Commons in 1800, before sitting for its successor constituency in the House of Commons of the United Kingdom until his death in 1831. He was a Whig.

In 1800, Somerville succeeded to his father's baronetcy. He married Mary Anne Meredyth, daughter of Richard Gorges-Meredyth, on 11 August 1801 and they had two sons, the eldest being William Somerville.

References

1772 births
1831 deaths
18th-century Anglo-Irish people
19th-century Anglo-Irish people
Baronets in the Baronetage of Ireland
Irish MPs 1798–1800
Members of the Parliament of Ireland (pre-1801) for County Meath constituencies
Members of the Parliament of the United Kingdom for County Meath constituencies (1801–1922)
Whig (British political party) MPs for Irish constituencies
UK MPs 1801–1802
UK MPs 1802–1806
UK MPs 1806–1807
UK MPs 1807–1812
UK MPs 1812–1818
UK MPs 1818–1820
UK MPs 1820–1826
UK MPs 1826–1830
UK MPs 1830–1831